Josaia Voreqe "Frank" Bainimarama  (Fijian: [tʃoˈsɛia βoˈreŋɡe mbɛiniˈmarama]; born 27 April 1954) is a Fijian politician and former naval officer who served as the prime minister of Fiji from 2007 until 2022. A member of the FijiFirst party, which he founded in 2014, he began his career as an officer in the Fijian navy and commander of the Fijian military. He served as the opposition leader from 24 December 2022 despite being suspended from Parliament until 8 March 2023, when he resigned and was replaced by Inia Seruiratu.

Bainimarama attended Marist Brothers High School, the Asian Institute of Technology and Dalhousie University. He joined the Fijian Navy in 1975 and rose through the ranks, becoming an Able Seaman and a Midshipman in 1976, an Ensign in 1977 and later promoted to a sub-lieutenant at the end of that year. He was promoted to lieutenant-commander in 1986 and became a commander in 1988. He later became captain in 1991. In 1997, Bainimarama was appointed Chief of Staff of the Republic of Fiji Military Forces. In 1998, he was promoted to a Commodore and later became the commander of the Armed Forces in 1999. He relinquished command in 2014, and in recognition of his military service, he was promoted to Rear Admiral.

Bainimarama instigated the 2006 coup, removing Prime Minister Laisenia Qarase from power. He later restored Ratu Josefa Iloilo as president and himself as prime minister in 2007. Bainimarama promised the return of elections and democracy in 2014, and formed a party named FijiFirst. In the 2014 Fijian general election, FijiFirst won a majority and Bainimarama was sworn in as prime minister of Fiji by President Ratu Epeli Nailatikau. In the 2018 Fijian general election, FijiFirst won an outright majority, and Bainimarama became prime minister for a second term on 20 November 2018. In the 2022 Fijian general election, FijiFirst won a plurality but was unable to form a government, meaning Bainimarama ceased to be Prime Minister after 16 years of rule, making him the second-longest serving Prime Minister of Fiji after Kamisese Mara. He was succeeded by Sitiveni Rabuka.

In January 2022, Bainimarama underwent heart surgery in Melbourne, Australia. During his recovery, Aiyaz Sayed-Khaiyum was named Acting Prime Minister. Bainimarama returned to Fiji in March 2022.

Military career 
Bainimarama's naval career spans three decades. He has received a number of honours for his service. He has been made an Officer Brother in the Order of St John of Jerusalem, and has received the Meritorious Service Decoration, the Peacekeeping Medal for United Nations peacekeepers, the General Service Medal, the Fiji Republic Medal, and the 25 Anniversary Medal.

Naval career 
Following his education at Marist Brothers High School, Bainimarama enlisted with the Fijian Navy on 26 July 1975 and rose smoothly through the ranks, becoming an Able Seaman in August 1976, a Midshipman in December the same year, and an Ensign on 1 November 1977.

After completing the Midshipmen's Supplementary Course in Australia, he was appointed Navigation officer of HMFS Kiro in August 1978. At the end of that year, he was promoted to Sub-Lieutenant. In January 1979, Bainimarama embarked on the Chilean naval training ship, the Buque Escuela Esmeralda, which spent six months circumnavigating South America. On his return to Fiji in August, Bainimarama was appointed executive officer of HMFS Kiro.

After a brief Navigation Course in HMAS Watson in March 1982, Bainimarama underwent Search and Rescue training at the United States Coast Guard Centre in New York City.  On his return to Fiji, he was appointed commander of HMFS Kikau, his first command post. He went on to command HMFS Kula, and spent four months in 1984 in the markings of the Exclusive Economic Zones of Tonga, Tuvalu, and Kiribati.  After being promoted to Lieutenant Commander in February 1986, he departed for Sinai where he served for eighteen months with the Multinational Force and Observers.

Bainimarama returned to Fiji in September 1987.  He took charge of the delivery of two naval ships, the Levuka and Lautoka, from Louisiana in the United States. He became Commanding Officer of the Fijian Navy in April 1988, and was promoted to the rank of Commander on 4 October that year.  He held this post for the next nine years.

Bainimarama underwent further training at the Malaysian Armed Forces Staff College in 1991 and at the Australian Defence Force Warfare Centre at RAAF Williamtown, Newcastle, New South Wales, where he studied Maritime Surveillance Training.  This was followed by Disaster Management training at the Asian Institute of Technology in 1993, and Exclusive Economic Zone Management training at Dalhousie University, Canada, in 1994. He was promoted to the rank of Captain in October of that year, and went on to attend the Australian Joint Services Staff College (JSSC). He attended the Integrated Logistics Support Overview course of the Australian Defence Co-operation Program on 23 September 1996, and the Chief of Army Conferences in Singapore in 1998 and 1999, as well as the Chief of Defence Conference in Hawaii.

Bainimarama was appointed as the Acting Chief of Staff on 10 November 1997, and was confirmed in this post on 18 April 1998.  On 1 March 1999, he was promoted to the rank of Commodore and was named commander of the Armed Forces, to replace Brigadier-General Ratu Epeli Ganilau, who resigned to pursue a political career.  It was in his capacity as commander of the Armed Forces that Bainimarama assumed command on 29 May 2000. He relinquished command on 5 March 2014, to Brigadier-General Mosese Tikoitoga. Bainimarama was promoted to the rank of rear admiral on his retirement in recognition of his military service.

Fiji coup of 2000 

A group led by George Speight, a businessman who had been declared bankrupt following the cancellation of several contracts by the government, entered Parliament buildings on 19 May 2000 and disaffected elements of the Fijian population rallied to his side. For 56 days Prime Minister Mahendra Chaudhry and most of his cabinet, along with many parliamentarians and their staff, were held as hostages while Speight attempted to negotiate with the president, Ratu Sir Kamisese Mara, who denounced the coup and declared a state of emergency.

Believing that President Kamisese Mara was not dealing effectively with the situation, Bainimarama forced Mara to resign on 29 May 2000, in what some politicians have since called "a coup within a coup," and formed an interim military government, which negotiated an accord under which the rebels would release all hostages, including the deposed Prime Minister Mahendra Chaudhry, and would surrender without penalty. The government later reneged on the last part of the agreement and arrested Speight on 27 July 2000, with Bainimarama saying that he had signed that part of the accord "under duress."

Post-2000 coup 
Bainimarama attended a Leadership and Change Management course with the Public Service Training and Development program in February 2002, and a Policy Planning Analysis and Management course at the University of the South Pacific in Suva the following month. He went on to attend the Defence and Strategic Studies Annual Conference at the Australian Defence College in Canberra on 2 August, and the Program for Senior Executives in National and International Security at Harvard University in the United States from 18 to 30 August. In November that year, he was promoted to Rear Admiral, but this promotion was reverted to Commodore on 1 February 2003. In 2014, he was made rear admiral again.

On 4 September 2003, Bainimarama attended the Pacific Armies Management Seminar XXVII in Seoul, South Korea, and went on to attend the PKO Capacity Building Seminar in the Philippine capital of Manila.

Despite his deteriorating relationship with the government, Bainimarama was reappointed commander of the Republic of Fiji Military Forces on 5 February 2004. That month, he attended the Pacific Area Special Operations Conference. This was followed by the Seminar Executive Course at the Asia Pacific Centre for Strategic Studies in Hawaii in April. In May and June, he attended the South East Asia Security Symposium. In September, he attended both the PAMS XXVII in the Indian capital of New Delhi, and the 7th Chief of Defence Conference in Tokyo, Japan.

On 14 December 2005, Bainimarama began an official visit to China, at the invitation of the People's Liberation Army.

Political career

Fijian coup d'état, 2006 

On 31 October 2006, while Bainimarama was in Egypt visiting Fijian forces on peacekeeping duties in the Middle East, President Iloilo moved to terminate the appointment of Bainimarama, appointing instead Lieutenant Colonel Meli Saubulinayau who declined to take the position. Senior Fijian military officers backed Bainimarama, who quickly called on the Government to resign. The governments of Australia, New Zealand, the U.S. and others called for calm, and asked for assurances that the Fijian military not rise against the government.

In late November 2006, Bainimarama handed down a list of demands to Qarase, one of which was the withdrawal of three controversial bills, including the Qoliqoli Bill (which would have transferred ownership of maritime resources to the Fijian people) and the Reconciliation, Tolerance, and Unity Bill, which would have offered conditional pardons to persons convicted of involvement in the 2000 coup.  Despite further talks in Suva and in Wellington, New Zealand, Bainimarama gave the Prime Minister Qarase an ultimatum of 4 December to accede to his demands or to resign. In a televised address, Qarase agreed to put the three contentious bills on hold, review the appointment of Andrew Hughes as police commissioner (Bainimarama had demanded his dismissal), and give the police the option of discontinuing investigations into the commander's alleged acts of sedition.  He refused further concessions, saying that he had conceded all that was possible within the law.

Military manoeuvres followed, including the seizure of government vehicles and the house arrest of Prime Minister Qarase.  On 5 December President Ratu Josefa Iloilo was said to have signed a legal order dissolving Parliament after meeting with Bainimarama.  The president later issued a statement categorically denying having signed any such decree, however, and the exiled Commissioner of Police, Andrew Hughes, implicated Iloilo's secretary in the fabrication of the decree at the direction of Commander Bainimarama.

As of 9 December, there were reported arrests of members of the media and open dissenters, as well as incidents of intimidation and violence committed against political figures. Stuart Huggett, chairman of the Public Service Commission, was reported to have been assaulted.

Bainimarama told a press conference on 15 December that he would agree to attend a forthcoming meeting of the Great Council of Chiefs, the feudal body empowered to choose the country's president, vice-president, and fourteen of the thirty two Senators, only in his capacity as president of the Republic, the Fiji Sun reported. Told that the Great Council still recognised Ratu Josefa Iloilo as president, he said that in that case he would boycott the meeting.  He also condemned the Great Council's invitation to deposed Prime Minister Laisenia Qarase, saying that Qarase would not be allowed to return to Suva to attend the meeting.

On 6 September 2007, Bainimarama imposed a renewed state of emergency for one month, alleging that Qarase and his spokesman were spreading lies and attempting to cause destabilisation, following Qarase's return to Suva after having been confined to the island of Vanua Balavu since his ouster. Bainimarama said that Qarase and his spokesman should return to Vanuabalavu and that they could "talk from there".

Bainimarama became acting Minister of Finance on 18 August 2008 after Chaudhry and the other Labour Party ministers withdrew from the interim government.

Explaining the coup
The immediate cause of the military coup was Prime Minister Qarase's refusal to withdraw the Qoliqoli Bill. Bainimarama stated that his main reasons for overthrowing the Qarase government were that it was corrupt, and that it was conducting racially discriminatory policies against the country's Indo-Fijian minority. In a speech publicly announcing the coup, he stated that Qarase's policies had "divided the nation now and will have very serious consequences to our future generations". He added that "the passing of the Reconciliation, Qoliqoli and Land Claims [Bills] will undermine the Constitution, will deprive many citizens of their rights as guaranteed under the Constitution and compromise and undermine the integrity of the Constitutional Offices including the Judiciary". He explained that he would amend the race-based electoral rolls, so as to "lead us into peace and prosperity and mend the ever widening racial divide that currently besets our multicultural nation".

Addressing the United Nations General Assembly in September 2007, he stated:

"[I]n 1970, Fiji started its journey as a young nation on a rather shaky foundation, with a race-based Constitution, one which rigidly compartmentalised our communities. The 'democracy' which came to be practised in Fiji was marked by divisive, adversarial, inward-looking, race-based politics. The legacy of leadership, at both community and national levels, was a fractured nation. Fiji's people were not allowed to share a common national identity.

Of the two major communities, indigenous Fijians were instilled with fear of dominance and dispossession by Indo-Fijians, and they desired protection of their status as the indigenous people. Indo-Fijians, on the other hand, felt alienated and marginalised, as second-class citizens in their own country, the country of their birth, Fiji. [...]

Fiji's overall situation by 2006 had deteriorated sharply, heightened by massive corruption and lawlessness [...].

[P]olicies which promote racial supremacy [...] must be removed once and for all. [...] Fiji will look at making the necessary legal changes in the area of electoral reform, to ensure true equality at the polls. [...] [E]very person will be given the right to vote for only one candidate, irrespective of race or religion."

This was to be achieved, he declared, through a People's Charter for Change, Peace and Progress, the stated aim of which was to "rebuild Fiji into a non-racial, culturally-vibrant and united, well-governed, truly democratic nation that seeks progress, and prosperity through merit-based equality of opportunity, and peace".

In April 2009, he told The Australian's Graham Davis:

"My vision for Fiji is one that's free of racism. That's the biggest problem we've had in the last 20 years and it needs to be taken out. It's the lies that are being fed to indigenous Fijians that are causing this, especially from our chiefs who are the dominating factor in our lives. And the politicians take advantage of that. We need to change direction in a dramatic way. We need to get rid of Qarase and everything associated with the 2000 coup and begin entirely on a new path."

Davis noted that Bainimarama had introduced greater ethnic diversity into senior positions, and suggested that "maybe that's what drives Bainimarama most of all; the notion, however quixotic, of a multiracial meritocracy belatedly fulfilling the great promise Fiji had in its early post-independence years, when a visiting pope John Paul II famously described it as a model for the developing world. Before the greed, the racism and the gun."

2009 constitutional crisis 

In April 2009, the Court of Appeal ruled the removal of the democratic government during his 2006 military coup was illegal.
Bainimarama stepped down on 10 April 2009 as interim prime minister.

President Ratu Josefa Iloilo then announced that he had abolished the constitution, assumed all governing power and revoked all judicial appointments.

After abolishing the constitution and sacking the judiciary, President Ratu Josefa Iloilo reappointed Commodore Frank Bainimarama as prime minister only 24 hours later. On 24 April, the president made him Companion of the Order of Fiji in recognition of his "eminent achievement and merit of highest degree and service to Fiji and to humanity at large".

On 3 November 2009, Bainimarama banished the envoys of Australia and New Zealand giving them 24 hours to leave the country.

Essential National Industries Decree

In September 2011, the Bainimarama government introduced a decree severely curtailing labour rights, so as to "ensure the present and continued viability and sustainability of essential national industries". In particular, the decree banned strikes in all but exceptional circumstances, subjecting them in addition to government authorisation on a case-by-case basis. It also curtailed the right for workers to take their grievances to courts of law. The Fiji Trades Union Congress said the decree "offers major weapons to the employers to utilise against unions [...] It outlaws professional trade unionists, eliminates existing collective agreements, promotes a biased system of non-professional bargaining agents to represent workers, severely restricts industrial action, strengthens sanctions against legally striking workers and bans overtime payments and other allowances for workers in 24-hour operations". Attar Singh, general secretary for the Fiji Islands Council of Trade Unions, said: "We have never seen anything worse than this decree. It is without doubt designed to decimate unions [...] by giving [employers] an unfair advantage over workers and unions". Amnesty International said the decree threatened "fundamental human rights [...], including the right to freedom of association and assembly, and the right to organise".

Electoral victories 
Bainimarama promised the return of elections and democracy in 2014, and formed a party named FijiFirst. In the 2014 Fijian general election, FijiFirst won a majority and Bainimarama was sworn in as prime minister of Fiji by President Ratu Epeli Nailatikau. In the 2018 Fijian general election, FijiFirst won an outright majority, and Bainimarama became prime minister for a second term on 20 November 2018. In the 2022 Fijian general election, FijiFirst won a plurality but was unable to form a government, meaning Bainimarama would cease to be prime-minister after 16 years of rule. He was succeeded by Sitiveni Rabuka on 24 December 2022. The same day, Bainimarama was elected leader of the opposition.

He has been described by some as a dictator or an authoritarian, although he denies these claims.

Suspension from Parliament
On 17 February 2023, Bainimarama was suspended from parliament for three years after making disparaging references to President Wiliame Katonivere and Prime Minister Sitiveni Rabuka, as well as making treasonous comments in breach of standing orders. However, he remains Opposition Leader.

On 8 March 2023 Bainimarama resigned from Parliament and as leader of the opposition.

On 9 March 2023 Bainimarama was charged with abuse of office over allegations he and police commissioner Sitiveni Qiliho interfered with an investigation into financial mismanagement at the University of the South Pacific. The two were released on bail the next day after pleading not guilty.

Cabinet

Personal life
Bainimarama hails from the village of Kiuva in the Kaba Peninsula, Tailevu Province.  He is the brother of Ratu Meli Bainimarama and Ratu Timoci Bainimarama, both senior civil servants. He was Roman Catholic-educated and graduated from Marist Brothers High School in Suva. He is married to Maria Makitalena; they have six children and several grandchildren.  He is a sports enthusiast, with a particular passion for rugby union and athletics; he became president of the Fiji Rugby Union on 31 May 2014. In January 2022, Bainimarama underwent heart surgery in Melbourne, Australia. During his recovery, Aiyaz Sayed-Khaiyum was named Acting Prime Minister. Bainimarama returned to Fiji in March 2022.

Bainimarama displays above his office desk portraits of Elizabeth II, former Queen of Fiji, and of her consort, Prince Philip, Duke of Edinburgh. He has said of himself: "I'm still loyal to the Queen. Many people are in Fiji. One of the things I'd like to do is see her restored as our monarch, to be Queen of Fiji again." However, in 2012 Bainimarama's government abolished the Queen's Official Birthday holiday in Fiji and replaced the Queen's image on Fiji's banknotes and coins with the Fijian coat of arms (themselves granted by royal warrant).

See also 
 Qoliqoli Bill
 People's Charter for Change and Progress 
List of foreign ministers in 2017
List of current foreign ministers
Office of the Prime Minister

References

External links 

Republic of Fiji Military Forces website
Bainimarama's speech, 5 December 2006: the stated reasons for the coup
Commodore Bainimarama's address to the 62nd session of the United Nations General Assembly, 28 September 2007 (video)
Commodore Bainimarama's address to the 63rd session of the United Nations General Assembly, 26 September 2008
Frank, Uncensored, ABC documentary by Philippa McDonald, 3 August 2010.

|-

|-

|-

|-

|-

|-

|-

|-

|-

|-

|-

|-

1954 births
Admirals
Fijian Roman Catholics
Fijian military leaders
Fijian Navy officers
FijiFirst politicians
Companions of the Order of Fiji
Finance Ministers of Fiji
Foreign Ministers of Fiji
Leaders who took power by coup
Living people
I-Taukei Fijian members of the Parliament of Fiji
Fijian monarchists
People educated at Marist Brothers High School, Fiji
Politicians from Tailevu Province
Presidents of Fiji
Prime Ministers of Fiji
Leaders of the Opposition (Fiji)
Dalhousie University alumni